Bronisławie  is a village in Gmina Ojrzeń, Ciechanów County, Masovian Voivodeship, Poland.

The village has a population of 152.

References

Villages in Ciechanów County